Bad Reputation is the name of the 1990 glam metal album by the band Dirty White Boy. It was the only album released by the band and spawned two singles "Let's Spend Momma's Money" and "Lazy Crazy". The album was produced by Beau Hill and released on the Polydor label. It is known that the band were unhappy with the sound of the final product and this could be another reason they decided to split.

Track listing
All tracks written by David Glen Eisley and Earl Slick; except where noted:

"Bad Reputation" 3:58  (D. Eisley, K. Richards, E. Slick)
"Lazy Crazy" 4:40
"Let's Spend Momma's Money" 4:27  (D. Eisley, K. Richards, E. Slick)
"You Give Me Love" 5:30   (D. Eisley, K. Richards, E. Slick)
"Dead Cat Alley" 6:36
"Hammer On the Heart" 4:53
"Hard Times" 5:27
"Soul of a Loaded Gun" 5:39
"One Good Reason" 4:32
"Badlands" 5:26

Personnel
 David Glen Eisley - lead vocals, keyboards and harmonica
 Earl Slick - lead guitar and backing vocals
 F. Kirk Alley - bass guitar and backing vocals
 Keni Richards - drums, percussion and backing vocals
 Billy Trudel - backing vocals

References

1990 debut albums
Albums produced by Beau Hill
Polydor Records albums